Mystery Woman is a 1935 American thriller film directed by Eugene Forde and written by Philip MacDonald. The film stars Mona Barrie, Gilbert Roland, John Halliday, Rod La Rocque, Mischa Auer and Billy Bevan. The film was released on January 8, 1935, Fox Film Corporation.

Plot

Top-secret documents being transported by French captain Jacques Benoit are stolen in Constantinople, resulting in his arrest and sentencing to Devil's Island. Determined to vindicate him, wife Margaret learns that Jacques had met wealthy Dr. Van Wyke in transit. Suspecting him, she books passage on an ocean liner to New York City under an assumed name and schemes to meet Van Wyke during the voyage.

Attracting romantic interest from passenger Juan Santanda as well as from Van Wyke, she finds the stolen documents and tries to hide them. Santanda turns out to be a jewel thief.  When she explains her true identity and purpose, he uses a blowtorch to open a safe and help her retrieve the documents, then sacrifices his own life when she is trapped, staying behind as he and Van Wyke kill one another. Jacques Benoit is released and presented the Legion of Honor medal.

Cast 
 Mona Barrie as Margaret Benoit
 Gilbert Roland as Juan Santanda
 John Halliday as Dr. Theodore Van Wyke
 Rod La Rocque as Jacques Benoit
 Mischa Auer as Dmitri
 Billy Bevan as Jepson
 William Faversham as Cambon
 Howard Lang as Bergstrom
 George Barraud as Stanton
 Arno Frey as Schultz

References

External links 
 

1935 films
Fox Film films
American thriller films
1930s thriller films
Films directed by Eugene Forde
American black-and-white films
1930s English-language films
1930s American films